Simcheon station is a South Korean railway station on the Gyeongbu Line.

Railway stations in North Chungcheong Province